Personal Relationships is a quarterly peer-reviewed academic journal published by John Wiley & Sons on behalf of the International Association for Relationship Research. It covers research on all aspects of  personal relationships, using methods from social psychology, sociology, communication studies, anthropology, family studies, developmental psychology, social work, and gerontology. It was established in 1994 by Cambridge University Press and the editor-in-chief is Ashley K. Randall (Arizona State University).

Abstracting and indexing 
The journal is abstracted and indexed in:

According to the Journal Citation Reports, the journal has a 2020 impact factor of 1.900, ranking it 64th out of 95 journals in the category "Communication" and 48th out of 66 journals in the category "Social Psychology".

References

External links 
 
 International Association for Relationship Research

Wiley (publisher) academic journals
Publications established in 1994
Quarterly journals
English-language journals
Psychology journals
Social psychology journals
Communication journals